Montalt  is a mountain that is part of the Serra de Montalt, Serra de Llaberia in Catalonia, Spain.

There is a triangulation station (256141001) at the summit.

See also
Tivissa
Mountains of Catalonia

References

External links
La Serra d'Almos

Mountains of Catalonia
Ribera d'Ebre